Onishchenko, also transliterated as Onischenko or Onishenko, is a Ukrainian surname and Russian surname of Ukrainian origin. There exists a Russified version of the surname, Anishchenko.

Notable people with the surname include:

Alexandr Onishenko (born 1957), Ukrainian and Chekh artist
Andriy Anishchenko (born 1975), Ukrainian footballer
Boris Onishchenko (born 1937), Ukrainian Soviet modern pentathlete
Gennadiy Onishchenko (born 1950), Russian politician

See also
 Onyshchenko
 
 

Ukrainian-language surnames